Collège Sacré-Coeur may refer to various Catholic schools and colleges:

Collège du Sacré-Coeur (Egypt)
Collège du Sacré-Coeur (New Brunswick), a former religious college that was merged with the Université de Moncton and the New Brunswick Community College
Collège du Sacré-Coeur (Sherbrooke)